Ryōji, Ryoji, Ryouji or Ryohji (written: , , , , , , , , , , ,  or ) is a masculine Japanese given name. Notable people with the name include:

, Japanese baseball player
, Japanese photographer
, Japanese illustrator
, Japanese businessman
, Japanese cross-country skier
, Japanese footballer
, Japanese footballer
, Japanese sound artist
, Japanese sumo wrestler
, Japanese baseball player
, Japanese footballer
, Japanese manga artist
, Japanese judge
, Japanese baseball player
, Japanese racewalker
, Japanese chemist
, Japanese professional wrestler
, Japanese sumo wrestler
, Imperial Japanese Army flight captain
, Japanese footballer
, Japanese footballer
, Japanese footballer
, Japanese bobsledder

Fictional characters
, a character in the video game Persona 3

Japanese masculine given names